Onaga is a city in Pottawatomie County, Kansas, United States.  As of the 2020 census, the population of the city was 679.

History
Onaga was platted in 1877 by the railroad. Onaga is derived from a Potawatomi personal Indian name (Onago) and was given by Paul E. Havens, President of the Kansas Central Railroad.

The first post office in Onaga was established in December 1877. Onaga originally incorporated as a city by 1881 and reincorporated in 1926.

Geography
Onaga is located at  (39.489415, -96.168993).

Climate
This climatic region is typified by large seasonal temperature differences, with warm to hot (and often humid) summers and cold (sometimes severely cold) winters.  According to the Köppen Climate Classification system, Onaga has a humid continental climate, abbreviated "Dfa" on climate maps.

Demographics

Onaga is part of the Manhattan, Kansas Metropolitan Statistical Area.

2010 census
As of the census of 2010, there were 702 people, 286 households, and 166 families residing in the city. The racial makeup of the city was 97.0% White, 0.3% African American, 0.4% Native American, 0.7% Asian, 0.3% from other races, and 1.3% from two or more races. Hispanic or Latino of any race were 2.0% of the population.

There were 286 households, of which 30.8% had children under the age of 18 living with them, 45.5% were married couples living together, 9.4% had a female householder with no husband present, 3.1% had a male householder with no wife present, and 42.0% were non-families. 37.8% of all households were made up of individuals, and 21.6% had someone living alone who was 65 years of age or older. The average household size was 2.32 and the average family size was 3.13.

The median age in the city was 40.8 years. 26.1% of residents were under the age of 18; 5.3% were between the ages of 18 and 24; 22.7% were from 25 to 44; 22.6% were from 45 to 64; and 23.4% were 65 years of age or older. The gender makeup of the city was 46.4% male and 53.6% female.

2000 census
As of the census of 2000, there were 704 people, 292 households, and 162 families residing in the city. The racial makeup of the city was 96.73% White, 0.28% African American, 0.71% Native American, 0.43% Asian, 0.28% from other races, and 1.56% from two or more races. Hispanic or Latino of any race were 2.41% of the population.

There were 292 households, out of which 27.4% had children under the age of 18 living with them, 46.9% were married couples living together, 6.5% had a female householder with no husband present, and 44.5% were non-families. 40.8% of all households were made up of individuals, and 25.7% had someone living alone who was 65 years of age or older. The average household size was 2.21 and the average family size was 3.02.

In the city, the population was spread out, with 23.6% under the age of 18, 6.1% from 18 to 24, 21.2% from 25 to 44, 19.9% from 45 to 64, and 29.3% who were 65 years of age or older. The median age was 44 years. For every 100 females, there were 86.7 males. For every 100 females age 18 and over, there were 81.1 males.

The median income for a household in the city was $28,929, and the median income for a family was $38,173. Males had a median income of $30,347 versus $21,250 for females. The per capita income for the city was $16,219. About 8.4% of families and 13.2% of the population were below the poverty line, including 17.5% of those under age 18 and 9.4% of those age 65 or over.

Education
The community is served by Onaga USD 322 public school district.

References

Further reading

External links
 City of Onaga
 Onaga - Directory of Public Officials
 Onaga city map, KDOT

Cities in Pottawatomie County, Kansas
Cities in Kansas
Manhattan, Kansas metropolitan area
1877 establishments in Kansas
Populated places established in 1877